Random boosting is a strategy used by the scheduler in Microsoft Windows to avoid deadlock due to priority inversion.  Ready threads holding locks are randomly boosted in priority and allowed to run long enough to exit the critical section.  If the thread doesn't get enough time to release the lock, it will get another chance.

References 

Processor scheduling algorithms